Kapılı is a village in the Silopi district of Şırnak Province in Turkey. The village is populated by Kurds of the Zewkan tribe and non-tribal affiliation and had a population of 304 in 2021.

The hamlet of Konaklı is attached to Kapılı.

References 

Villages in Silopi District
Kurdish settlements in Şırnak Province